There are at least 69 named lakes and reservoirs in Rosebud County, Montana.

Lakes

Reservoirs
 Absolen Reservoir, el. 
 Barley Reservoir, el. 
 Barley Reservoirs, el. 
 Big Reservoir, el. 
 Bighead Reservoir, el. 
 Black Canyon Reservoir, el. 
 Black Coulee Reservoir, el. 
 Black Sea Reservoir, el. 
 Blacktail Reservoir, el. 
 Boies Reservoir, el. 
 Bowman Reservoir, el. 
 Boyce Reservoir, el. 
 Bridge Creek Reservoir, el. 
 Brown Coulee Reservoir, el. 
 Castle Rock Lake, el. 
 Coal Bank Reservoir, el. 
 Donald Reservoir, el. 
 Donley Reservoir, el. 
 Donleys Reservoir, el. 
 East Fork Reservoir, el. 
 East Fork Reservoir, el. 
 Edith Reservoir, el. 
 Experimental Pasture Reservoir, el. 
 Fields Reservoir, el. 
 Fisherman Dan Reservoir, el. 
 Green Creek Reservoir, el. 
 Hamilton Draw Reservoir, el. 
 Haywood Reservoir, el. 
 Hertzler Reservoir, el. 
 Hoover Reservoir, el. 
 Horse Creek Basin Reservoir, el. 
 Kerns Reservoir, el. 
 King Creek Reservoir, el. 
 Kreger Reservoir, el. 
 Lee Creek Reservoir, el. 
 Lei Reservoir, el. 
 Lower Blacktail Reservoir, el. 
 Needle Butte Reservoir, el. 
 Newell Creek Reservoir, el. 
 O'Dell Reservoir, el. 
 Pittman Reservoir, el. 
 Poker Jim Reservoir, el. 
 Poker Jim Reservoir Number Two, el. 
 Poker Teechee Reservoir, el. 
 Reavis Reservoir, el. 
 Red Rock Reservoir Number One, el.
 Red Rock Reservoir Number Two, el. 
 Redeen, el. 
 Roberts Gulch Reservoir, el. 
 Round Butte Reservoir, el. 
 Round Cow Reservoir, el. 
 Schaudel Reservoir, el. 
 Skinny Reservoir, el. 
 Snyder Reservoir, el. 
 Stellar Lake, el. 
 Sunday Creek Reservoir, el. 
 Thebes Lake, el. 
 Three X Bar Reservoir, el. 
 Three X Bar Reservoir Number Two, el. 
 Timber Creek Basin Reservoir, el. 
 Timber Creek Reservoir, el. 
 Trail Creek Reservoir, el. 
 Wagner Reservoir, el. 
 Water Gap Reservoir, el. 
 Wolff Reservoir, el. 
 Woodard Reservoir, el. 
 Woodbury Reservoir, el. 
 Zempel Lake, el. 
 Zemple Lake, el.

See also
 List of lakes in Montana

Notes

Bodies of water of Rosebud County, Montana
Rosebud